In algebraic geometry and commutative algebra, the theorems of generic flatness and generic freeness state that under certain hypotheses, a sheaf of modules on a scheme is flat or free. They are due to Alexander Grothendieck.

Generic flatness states that if Y is an integral locally noetherian scheme,  is a finite type morphism of schemes, and F is a coherent OX-module, then there is a non-empty open subset U of Y such that the restriction of F to u−1(U) is flat over U.

Because Y is integral, U is a dense open subset of Y. This can be applied to deduce a variant of generic flatness which is true when the base is not integral. Suppose that S is a noetherian scheme,  is a finite type morphism, and F is a coherent OX module. Then there exists a partition of S into locally closed subsets S1, ..., Sn with the following property: Give each Si its reduced scheme structure, denote by Xi the fiber product , and denote by Fi the restriction ; then each Fi is flat.

Generic freeness 
Generic flatness is a consequence of the generic freeness lemma. Generic freeness states that if A is a noetherian integral domain, B is a finite type A-algebra, and M is a finite type B-module, then there exists a non-zero element f of A such that Mf is a free Af-module. Generic freeness can be extended to the graded situation: If B is graded by the natural numbers, A acts in degree zero, and M is a graded B-module, then f may be chosen such that each graded component of Mf is free.

Generic freeness is proved using Grothendieck's technique of dévissage. Another version of generic freeness can be proved using Noether's normalization lemma.

References

Bibliography 
 
 

Algebraic geometry
Commutative algebra
Theorems in abstract algebra